The Illinois general election was held on November 3, 2020. Primary elections, held using an open primary system, took place on March 17, 2020.

Election information

Impact of COVID-19

Illinois held its primary elections as scheduled despite concerns over the COVID-19 pandemic in the United States. State election officials believed that this depressed voter turnout.

On June 16, 2020, Governor J. B. Pritzker signed a bill aimed at making it safer to vote in the November election. To encourage voting by mail, citizens who voted in the primary election, the 2019 local elections, or the 2018 general election were to be sent applications for mail-in ballots by August 1, 2020. The bill also made November 3 a state holiday for schools and government offices to reduce the number of people present at voting sites.

Turnout

Primary election
For the primary election, turnout was 28.36%, with 2,279,439 votes cast. Democratic ballots accounted for 74.80% of ballots, while Republican ballots accounted for 24.72%. Data shows that mail-in ballots likely accounted for roughly 10% of votes cast. Over 636,000 of votes cast were done so as early votes.

Primary election voting occurred amid concerns over the COVID-19 pandemic in the United States, and election officials in Illinois acknowledged that they believed the turnout was unusually low. The turnout rate was an 18.20 percentage point decrease from the turnout in 2016 primaries. However, the turnout was not extraordinarily low, as four out of the past ten Illinois primaries in presidential election years had seen turnout under 30%, with 2000 having seen an even lower primary election turnout than 2020.

Primary election turnout by county

General election
General election turnout was 72.92%. Every county in the state had more than a majority of registered voters cast ballots.

General election turnout by county

Federal elections

United States President 

Illinois was won by the Democratic ticket of Joe Biden and Kamala Harris.

This was the eighth consecutive presidential election in which Illinois had voted for the Democratic ticket.

United States Senate 

Illinois' Class 2 United States Senate seat was up for election. Incumbent Democrat Dick Durbin won a fifth term.

United States House 

All eighteen of Illinois' congressional seats were up for reelection.

State elections

State House of Representatives 

Elections were held for all 118 seats in the Illinois House of Representatives. Democrats maintained their majority.

State Senate

Elections were held for 22 out of 59 seats in the Illinois Senate. Democrats maintained their supermajority.

Judicial elections 

Elections were held for three seats in the Supreme Court of Illinois and 10 seats in the Illinois Appellate Court.

Ballot measure

Illinois Fair Tax

Illinois voters rejected the Illinois Fair Tax amendment, known formally as the "Allow for Graduated Income Tax Amendment", an amendment that appeared on ballots statewide in the general election. This was placed on the ballot by the state legislature in June 2019, and was a key campaign issue in Governor J. B. Pritzker's 2018 election. In order to be approved, the measure had been required to receive either 60% support among those specifically voting on the amendment or 50% support among all ballots cast in the state's election. If it had been approved, the measure would have amended the Constitution of Illinois to allow for a graduated income tax in the state.

Local elections 
Local elections are also being held. These include county elections.

Cook County 

In Cook County, elections was held for State's Attorney, Clerk of the Circuit Court, one seat on the Board of Review, 3 seats on the Water Reclamation District Board, and several judgeships in the Circuit Court of Cook County and its subcircuits.

See also 
 2018 Illinois elections
 2016 Illinois elections

Notes

References

External links
 
 
  (State affiliate of the U.S. League of Women Voters)
 

 
Illinois